Arnos is a commune in the Pyrénées-Atlantiques department in the Nouvelle-Aquitaine region of south-western France.

The inhabitants of the commune are known as Arnosiens or Arnosiennes.

Geography

Arnos is located some 25 km north-west of Pau and 10 km east of Arthez-de-Béarn. Access to the commune is by road D276 from Castillon in the west passing through the commune and the village and continuing south-east then east to join the D945. There is a large Formula 3 racetrack in the south of the commune run by the Moto Club Pau-Arnos. The commune consists of farmland except for a few small patches of forest.

The river Aubin, a tributary of the Luy de Béarn (Adour basin), flows through the commune.

Places and Hamlets

 Bousquet
 Carracou
 Cassauba
 Castandet
 Castéra
 Marquine
 Monplaisir
 Montagut
 Pallane
 Pédoussau
 Péré
 Péruilh
 Péruillet
 Pétrou
 Poey (ruins)
 Saintong
 Sansot

Neighbouring communes and villages

Toponymy
The name Arnos appears in the form Arnas on the Cassini Map.

History
In the 16th century, Arnos was an annex of Boumourt.

Administration

List of Successive Mayors

Inter-communality
Arnos is part of four inter-communal structures:
 the Communauté de communes de Lacq-Orthez;
 the Water and sanitation association of Trois Cantons ;
 the Energy association of Pyrénées-Atlantiques ;
 the inter-communal association of Arthez-de-Béarn.

Demography
In 2017, the commune had 113 inhabitants.

Sports Venues

The racing Circuit Pau-Arnos is in the south of the commune.

See also
Communes of the Pyrénées-Atlantiques department

References

External links
Arnos on the Community of communes of Arthez-de-Béarn website 
Arnos on Géoportail, National Geographic Institute (IGN) website 
Arnas on the 1750 Cassini Map

Communes of Pyrénées-Atlantiques